William M. Leete Jr. (born c. 1944) is a former American football and baseball player, coach, and college athletics administrator.  He was the head coach of Hofstra University's football team from 1975 to 1980. He compiled a 30–23–1 overall record. After leaving Hofstra, Leete went on to become the athletic director at the University of New Haven.

Head coaching record

Football

References

External links
 Vermont Athletic Hall of Fame profile

Year of birth uncertain
1940s births
Living people
American football defensive backs
American football quarterbacks
Baseball third basemen
Hofstra Pride baseball coaches
Hofstra Pride football coaches
New England Collegiate Conference commissioners
New Haven Chargers athletic directors
People from Williamstown, Massachusetts
Vermont Catamounts baseball players
Vermont Catamounts football coaches
Vermont Catamounts football players